"Unplugged" Live is a live album by the McAuley Schenker Group, recorded in California, during a tour with a completely acoustic set. Michael Schenker released this live album at the height of "unplugged" mania in the early 1990s, revising his blistering guitar antics as reflective, nylon-string, semi-classical ballads. The album features Shark Island guitarist Spencer Sercombe on second guitar and backing vocals. "Unplugged" Live is the final release of the McAuley Schenker Group, which disbanded in 1993; Robin McAuley got married and retired from the music scene for a few years, while Michael Schenker began working on instrumental solo projects.

Track listing

Japanese bonus tracks

Personnel
Robin McAuley – vocals, tambourine
Michael Schenker – lead and rhythm guitars
Spencer Sercombe – 12 string and 6 string rhythm guitars, background vocals, second part of lead break on "Gimme Your Love"

Production
Robin McAuley and Michael Schenker – producers
Recorded at: Anaheim, California March 25, 1992
Mixed by: Bill Dooley at Brooklyn Recording Studios in Los Angeles

References

1992 live albums
EMI Records live albums
McAuley Schenker Group live albums
Impact Records live albums